The inferior hypogastric plexus (pelvic plexus in some texts) is a network of nerves that supplies the organs of the pelvic cavity. The inferior hypogastric plexus gives rise to the prostatic plexus in males and the uterovaginal plexus in females.

The inferior hypogastric plexus is a paired structure, meaning there is one on the left and the right side of the body. These are located on either side of the rectum in males, and at the sides of the rectum and vagina in females. For this reason, injury to this structure can arise as a complication of pelvic surgeries and may cause urinary dysfunction and urinary incontinence. Testing of bladder function is used in that case to show a poorly compliant bladder, with bladder neck incompetence, and fixed external sphincter tone.

Structure
The plexus is formed from:
 a continuation of the superior hypogastric plexus on either side, at the sacral promontory in the interiliac triangle. At this location, the presacral nerve sits in the middle in only 25% of people and is more commonly present on the left.
 sacral splanchnic nerves, from the sympathetic trunk.
 pelvic splanchnic nerves (from the second, third, and fourth sacral nerves) also contribute parasympathetic efferent fibers to the plexus.

From these plexuses numerous branches are distributed to the viscera of the pelvis.

They accompany the branches of the internal iliac artery.

It is the source for the middle rectal plexus, vesical plexus, prostatic plexus, and uterovaginal plexus.

Additional images

See also
 Superior hypogastric plexus
 Hypogastric nerve

References

External links
 
 
 
 

Nerve plexus
Nerves of the torso